Évelyne de la Chenelière (born 1975) is a Canadian writer and actress. She is best known for her plays Désordre public, which won the Governor General's Award for French-language drama in 2006, and Bashir Lazhar, which was the screenplay basis for the 2011 film Monsieur Lazhar.

She studied at Villa Maria College (class of 1992) and Collège Jean-de-Brébeuf. She then began studies in modern literature at the Sorbonne and theater at the École Michel-Granvale in Paris .

As an actress, de la Chenelière had supporting roles in Monsieur Lazhar, Days of Darkness (L'Âge des ténèbres), Another House (L'autre maison), Café de Flore and Laughter (Le Rire), as well as working extensively on stage.

She published her first novel, La concordance des temps, in 2011.

Her father is the publisher and philanthropist Michel de la Chenelière. She lives in Montreal.

Works

Plays
1997: Personnages secondaires
1999: Au bout du fil
1999: Des fraises en janvier
2000: Culpa
2000: Toka
2000: Élucubrations couturières
2001: Les journaux de ma grand-mère (dans Yanardagh)
2002: Bashir Lazhar
2002: Henri & Margaux
2004: Aphrodite en 04
2004: Nicht retour, mademoiselle
2005: Chinoiseries
2005: L'héritage de Darwin
2006: Désordre public
2006: L'Éblouissement du chevreuil
2009: L'imposture

Novels
2011: La concordance des temps

References

External links

1975 births
Canadian women dramatists and playwrights
Canadian women novelists
Canadian film actresses
Canadian stage actresses
Writers from Quebec
Actresses from Quebec
Living people
21st-century Canadian novelists
Governor General's Award-winning dramatists
20th-century Canadian dramatists and playwrights
21st-century Canadian dramatists and playwrights
20th-century Canadian women writers
21st-century Canadian women writers
Canadian dramatists and playwrights in French
Canadian novelists in French